Attorney General Woulfe may refer to:

Arthur Wolfe, 1st Viscount Kilwarden (1739–1803), Attorney-General for Ireland
Séamus Woulfe (born 1963), Attorney General of Ireland
Stephen Woulfe (1787–1840), Attorney-General for Ireland